According to the 2021 Canadian census, over 450 "ethnic or cultural origins" were self-reported by Canadians. The major panethnic origin groups in Canada are: European, North American, Asian, North American Indigenous, African, Latin, Central and South American, Caribbean, Oceanian, and Other. Statistics Canada reports that 35.5% of the population reported multiple ethnic origins, thus the overall total is greater than 100%.

The country's ten largest self-reported specific ethnic or cultural origins in 2021 were Canadian (accounting for 15.6 percent of the population), followed by English (14.7 percent), Irish (12.1 percent), Scottish (12.1 percent), French (11.0 percent), German (8.1 percent), Chinese (4.7 percent), Italian (4.3 percent), Indian (3.7 percent), and Ukrainian (3.5 percent).

Of the 36.3 million people enumerated in 2021 approximately 25.4 million reported being "white", representing  69.8 percent of the population. The indigenous population representing 5 percent or 1.8 million individuals, grew by 9.4 percent compared to the non-Indigenous population, which grew by 5.3 percent from 2016 to 2021.  One out of every four Canadians or 26.5 percent of the population belonged to a non-White and non-Indigenous visible minority, the largest of which in 2021 were South Asian (2.6 million people; 7.1 percent), Chinese (1.7 million; 4.7 percent) and Black (1.5 million; 4.3 percent).

Between 2011 and 2016, the visible minority population rose by 18.4 percent. In 1961, less than two percent of Canada's population (about 300,000 people) were members of visible minority groups. The 2021 census indicated that 8.3 million people, or almost one-quarter (23.0 percent) of the population reported themselves as being or having been a landed immigrant or permanent resident in Canada—above the 1921 census previous record of 22.3 percent. In 2021, India, China, and the Philippines were the top three countries of origin for immigrants moving to Canada.

Statistics Canada report on race and ethnicity in Canada in 2022
The 2020 General Social Survey revealed that 92% of adult Canadians said that "[ethnic] diversity is a Canadian value". About 25% of Canadians were "racialized"; By 2021, 23% of the Canadian population were immigrantsthe "largest proportion since Confederation", according to Statistics Canada. Prior to the early 1970s, most new Canadians came from Europe. Since then, more immigrants have come from Asia, the Middle East, and Africa. In 2021, most immigrants came from Asia, which includes the Middle East. About 25% of Canadians were "racialized"; By 2021, almost 5% of Canadians self-identify as Muslim. Almost million Canadians self-identified as Indigenous.

Data collection method
Listed below are the ethnic groups of Canadian residents (citizens, landed immigrants and non-citizen temporary residents) as self-identified in the 2016 census  in which approximately 35,151,000 census forms were completed). The relevant census question asked for "the ethnic or cultural origins" of the respondent's ancestors and not the respondents themselves.
As data were collected by self-declaration, ethnic groups may not necessarily correspond to the true ancestry of respondents. Many respondents acknowledged multiple ancestries.  These people were added to the "multiple origin" total for each origin listed.  These include responses as varied as a respondent who listed eight different origins and a respondent who answered "French Canadian" (leading to them being counted once for "French" and once for "Canadian").  As with all self-reported data, understanding of the question may have varied from respondent to respondent.

Larger ethnic origins (200,000 or more individuals per group; 2016 census)

Smaller ethnic origins (2016 census)

Evolution from 1871 to 1921 

During the fifty-year period beginning from the first census of independent Canada in 1871 until the census of 1921, the national ethnic composition was multicultural, however in the early period was dominated by four origin groups from western and northern Europe; French, English, Irish, and Scottish. Following the French and British Isles origin groups, Continental European communities were the largest in Canada, and grew fairly rapidly between the 1901 census and the 1921 census. Nominally small East Asian, South Asian, West Asian, and West African descended communities also existed during this time period.

The ethnic French population, comprising a plurality of the total population from confederation until just prior to the 1921 census, overwhelmingly relied on natural increase for growth, with progeny stemming from early settlers who arrived throughout the 17th and 18th centuries; migration from France had been severely curtailed by the British empire and early governments of independent Canada. Population growth amongst the French population occurred at relatively high pace, increasing from 1,082,940 persons in 1871 to 2,452,743 persons in 1921. Despite an increase of nearly 1.5 million persons during this fifty-year period, the French proportion of the total Canadian population dropped slightly, from 31.1 percent, to 27.1 percent.

By contrast, large population increases amongst the three main ethnic groups from the British Isles (English, Irish, and Scottish) occurred through natural increase but relied heavily on high immigration rates that began in the early-mid 19th century dubbed the Great Migration of Canada − this continued through the early 20th century, spurred by record immigration rates during the 1900s and 1910s, when English immigrants formed a majority or plurality of all immigrants to Canada on an annual and decadal basis.

The English population, in particular, grew at a rapid pace, increasing from 705,369 persons in 1871 to 2,545,358 persons in 1921, representing an increase of nearly 2 million persons during the fifty-year period. During the same time period, the English proportion of the total Canadian population rose from 20.3 percent to 29.0 percent. The English community experienced massive growth principally during the first two decades of the 20th century as a result of record immigration at the time; during the era, persons of English descent also became the single largest ethnic group in Canada, comprising a plurality of the Canadian population by the 1921 census.

The Irish population, meanwhile, witnessed steady, slowing population growth during the late 19th and early 20th century, with the proportion of the total Canadian population dropping from 24.3 percent in 1871 to 12.6 percent in 1921 and falling from the second-largest ethnic group in Canada from to fourth − principally due to massive immigration flows from England to Canada at the time − despite the population increasing from 846,414 persons to 1,107,803 persons in the fifty-year timeframe. The largest Irish population increases occurred prior to confederation, spurred by mass immigration during the mid-19th century at the height of the Great Migration of Canada, and was primarily due to The Great Famine and related poor economic conditions in Ireland at the time.

At the turn of the 20th century, overall immigrant proportions from the British Isles to Canada gradually dropped from a majority to a plurality. At the time, the federal government began supplementing increased mass immigration from the British Isles (mainly England) by also permitting large migration flows from continental Europe, especially Germany, Scandinavia, and the Soviet Union. This was primarily as a result of federal policy aimed at settling the Prairies through ethnic block settlements and ultimately led to the highest annual immigration rates in Canadian history since confederation in 1867 that remain unsurpassed in the contemporary era, including 1913 (new immigrants accounted for 5.3 percent of the total population), 1912 (5.1 percent), 1911 (4.6 percent), 1907 (4.3 percent) and 1910 (4.1 percent).

Largely due to increased immigration levels outside of the British Isles, the continental European population grew rapidly during the first two decades of the 20th century − comprising 1,246,151 persons or 14.2 percent as proportion of the total Canadian population by the 1921 census, representing a numerical increase of over 1 million persons from fifty years earlier in 1871, when the continental European population stood at approximately 236,043 persons or 6.8 percent of the total Canadian population.

Broadening the multicultural makeup of Canada, the diversity across the Prairie provinces during the early 20th century was soon dubbed a Cultural mosaic by journalist Victoria Hayward in the early 1920s:

Evolution from 1996 to 2016 
As regards combined responses, Canadian is the most common ethnic origin (11,113,965) in the 2016 Census (see above). This was also the case in the 2011 NHS (10,563,805), 2006 Census (10,066,290), 2001 Census (11,682,680), and the 1996 Census (8,806,975). Canadian was also the most common single ethnic origin in the 1996 (5,326,995), 2001 (6,748,135), 2006 (5,748,725), 2011 (5,834,535), and 2016 (6,436,940).

Visible minority

Aboriginal population 

Note: Inuit, other Aboriginal and mixed Aboriginal groups are not listed as their own, but they are all accounted for in total Aboriginal

See also

 1666 census of New France
 Canada 1911 Census
 Canada 1996 Census
 Canada 2001 Census
 Canada 2006 Census
 Canada 2011 Census
 Canada 2016 Census
 Demographics of Canada
 Immigration to Canada
 Canada immigration statistics
 Multiculturalism in Canada
 Population of Canada by years

Notes

References

Further reading

External links

 Canada Year Book 2010 – Statistics Canada

Lists of Canadian people by ethnic or national origin
Demographics of Canada
 
Immigration to Canada